The JetBeetle Tarantula H90 is an American gas-turbine engine for use on Homebuilt aircraft

It is capable of producing  thrust at 88,900rpm.

Variants
Tarantula H90 
Tarantula H100 (Updated H90 released summer 2016)  

Locust H150R 

Mantis H250

Applications
Monnett Monerai

Specifications (Tarantula H90)

Notes

2010s turbofan engines
Microjet engines